Čestmír Loukotka (12 November 1895 – 13 April 1966) was a Czechoslovak linguist and ethnologist. His daughter was Jarmila Loukotková.

Career 
Loukotka proposed a classification for the languages of South America based on several previous works. This classification contained a lot of unpublished material and was therefore superior to all previous classifications. He divided the languages of South America and the Caribbean into 77 different families, based upon similarities of vocabulary and available lists. His classification of 1968 is the most influential and was based upon two previous schemes (1935, 1944), which were similar to those proposed by Paul Rivet (whom he was a student of), although the number of families was increased to 94 and 114.

References 

1895 births
1958 deaths
Linguists from the Czech Republic
Paleolinguists
Linguists of indigenous languages of the Americas
20th-century linguists